The flag of the Trust Territory of the Pacific Islands  (TTPI) consisted of a light blue field that contained six white stars centered in a circle pattern. The stars symbolized the six districts of the Trust Territory of the Pacific Islands: the Marianas, the Marshall Islands, Yap, Chuuk, Pohnpei (including Kosrae), and Palau. The blue field symbolized freedom and loyalty.

The flag was the end product of a contest that was won by Gonzalo Santos, a government employee who lived in the Yap district. For his efforts, he won US$250. The Santos design was approved by the Council of Micronesia (an unofficial body) on October 3, 1962, and was first used on October 24. The flag was reapproved by the TTPI High Commissioner and the Congress of Micronesia in July 1965. The flag became official on August 19, 1965. 

Before this time, the United States and United Nations flags were used in the trusteeship. 

The flag was used until the 1970s and early 1980s. By this time, each district of the TTPI had adopted its own unique flag.

See also
Flag of the Northern Mariana Islands
Flag of the Marshall Islands
Flag of the Federated States of Micronesia
Flag of Palau

References 
 
 
Micronesia. World Statesmen. Retrieved April 26, 2005. <http://worldstatesmen.org/Micronesia.htm>
Smith, Whitney. The Flag Book of the United States 1970,  p. 210.

1962 establishments in the Trust Territory of the Pacific Islands
Trust Territory of the Pacific Islands
Trust Territory of the Pacific Islands
History of Micronesia
Trust Territory of the Pacific Islands
History of the Marshall Islands
History of Palau